The Roman Catholic Diocese of Gualeguaychú is a Latin suffragan bishopric in the ecclesiastical province of the Metropolitan Archdiocese of Paraná in Entre Ríos Province, eastern-central Argentina.

Its cathedral episcopal see is Catedral San José, dedicated to Saint Joseph, in Gualeguaychú, also in Entre Rios province, which also has a Minor basilica : Basílica de la Inmaculada Concepción del Uruguay, dedicated to the Immaculate Conception, in Concepción del Uruguay.

History 
Established on 11 February 1957 as Diocese of Gualeguaychú / Gualeguaychen(sis) (Latin), on territory split off from its Metropolitan, the Archdiocese of Paraná.

Statistics 
As per 2014, it pastorally served 308,410 Catholics (89.7% of 343,789 total) on 33,887 km² in 35 parishes and a mission with 61 priests (48 diocesan, 13 religious), 4 deacons, 77 lay religious (23 brothers, 54 sisters) and 10 seminarians.

Bishops

Ordinaries
 Jorge Ramón Chalup (1957-1966)
 Pedro Boxler (1967-1996)
 Luis Guillermo Eichhorn (1996-2004), appointed Bishop of Morón
 Jorge Eduardo Lozano (2005-2016), appointed Coadjutor Archbishop and later Archbishop of San Juan de Cuyo
 Héctor Luis Zordán, M.SS.CC. (2017–present)

Other priest of this diocese who became bishop
Ricardo Oscar Faifer, appointed Bishop of Goya in 2002

See also 
 List of Catholic dioceses in Argentina

Sources and external links 
 

Roman Catholic dioceses in Argentina
Roman Catholic Ecclesiastical Province of Paraná
Religious organizations established in 1957
Roman Catholic dioceses and prelatures established in the 20th century
Gualeguaychú, Entre Ríos